The A44 is a major road in the United Kingdom that runs from Oxford in southern England to Aberystwyth in west Wales.

History
The original (1923) route of the A44 was Chipping Norton to Aberystwyth. No changes were made to the route of the A44 in the early years. The A44 was extended to Oxford in the 1990s, replacing part of the A34 when the M40 motorway was completed.

Route

Oxford–Evesham

The road begins at a roundabout junction with the A40 road on the northern section of Oxford's ring road in Oxfordshire. It has a grade separated junction with the A34 road (leading to the M40 motorway and Winchester). From here, the road runs northwest, and has a  section of dual-carriageway through the villages of Yarnton and Begbroke before reaching the town of Woodstock, home to Blenheim Palace. The road then reaches the main market street in Chipping Norton before entering the Cotswolds. The road here has many hills and turns, and is single-carriageway with some tight bends, with not much opportunity for overtaking.

The road then enters Gloucestershire, and the town of Moreton in Marsh, before sweeping up through woodland until it reaches Fish Hill near Broadway in Worcestershire. At this point, it becomes 3-lane and descends steeply through some sharp bends. It then bypasses Broadway before meeting up with the A46/A435 Evesham bypass.

Evesham–Leominster

On reaching the northern end of the Evesham bypass the A44 heads northwest, passing Wyre Piddle and the town of Pershore before reaching the crossroads near Spetchley. The road then crosses the M5 motorway and onto Worcester's eastern bypass (A4440). It then turns south along the bypass before rejoining its original line west into the city itself. The road passes the Cathedral, crosses the River Severn and then meets the western end of the bypass.

After leaving Worcester, the A44 continues west past the village of Broadwas, following the River Teme until Knightwick where enters Herefordshire as it climbs over Bringsty Common before descending towards Bromyard. The A44 bypasses Bromyard town centre and heads west over the downs to Bredenbury. It then crosses the River Lugg before meeting the A49 Leominster bypass, where it turns left and heads through the town centre.

Leominster–Rhayader
After leaving Leominster, the A44 crosses the River Arrow to bypass Monkland. The road then heads towards the black and white villages of Eardisland and Pembridge. After Pembridge the A44 meanders west, passing numerous orchards en route, before reaching Lyonshall, where the road meets the A480 and passes Offa's Dyke. A couple of miles later and the A44 meets Kington. The road bypasses the town and follows the River Arrow before reaching the Welsh border. 

Leaving Herefordshire and entering Powys, the road continues through Walton and passes the village of New Radnor, before turning south to Llanfihangel Nant Melan. The road then turns northwest to do some serious hill-climbing before winding its way downhill to a plateau. A few miles later it reaches Penybont and Crossgates, where it meets the A483 road. Eight miles further the A44 reaches Rhayader.

A spoof sign on this section of the road, announcing "Llandegley International Airport 2½ ", has attracted international press coverage and been mentioned in Parliament.

Rhayader–Aberystwyth

Leaving Llangurig, the road starts clinging to hillsides as it winds its way through the Cambrian Mountains.

The road enters Ceredigion and the next hamlet is Eisteddfa Gurig which, at 1339 feet (408 metres) above sea level, is its highest point and the location of the iconic Elvis Rock. The A44 then descends into the remote settlement of Ponterwyd. The road passes several abandoned mines en route to the villages of Goginan and Capel Bangor, where it meets the River Rheidol. The road then passes the village of Llanbadarn Fawr, continuing for the last mile through the outskirts of Aberystwyth before terminating on the A487 at Penglais Hill.

Former routes

Bypasses and realignments
 Evesham: the route used to go through the centre of the town, but now runs to the north.
 Evesham–Worcester: the route used to run on a road to the south.
 Kington, Herefordshire, the road bypasses the centre of the town using the former Leominster and Kington Railway tracked north of the town.
 Wyre Piddle. In 2004 the A44 was rerouted down the A4538 between Evesham and Worcester and therefore no longer goes down Pershore High Street.  The old route is now known as the B4084.

See also
Trunk roads in Wales

References

External links

 SABRE page on the A44

1923 establishments in the United Kingdom
Roads in Ceredigion
Roads in Herefordshire
Roads in Oxfordshire
Transport in Oxford
Roads in Powys
Roads in Worcestershire
Transport in Worcester, England